Steven Dillingham served as the 25th director of the United States Census Bureau from January 7, 2019, to January 20, 2021.

Education
Dillingham graduated from Rock Hill High School in Rock Hill, South Carolina in 1970. From 1970 to 1972 he attended the US Air Force Academy. Dillingham graduated from Winthrop University in 1973 with a bachelor's degree in political science. He received his J.D., M.P.A., and Ph.D. from the University of South Carolina, and completed his M.B.A. at the George Washington University School of Business and LL.M. at Georgetown Law.

Career 
Dillingham is a career member of the U.S. federal government's Senior Executive Service, with more than 25 years of statistical, research, senior management, and legal experience. Dillingham's prior experience heading federal statistical service agencies includes a stint as Director of the Bureau of Justice Statistics and the Bureau of Transportation Statistics. Dillingham also served as Director of the Peace Corps Office of Strategic Information, Research, and Planning. Other federal service includes directing research and planning for the Department of Justice's United States Trustee Program, and directing surveys for the Office of Personnel Management. 

In addition, Dillingham was the deputy director for the National District Attorneys Association and administrator of the American Prosecutors Research Institute. Dillingham has served on the faculties of the University of South Carolina and George Mason University. He is a senior certified professional with the Society for Human Resource Management.

U.S. Census 
Dillingham was sworn in as the 25th director of the United States Census Bureau on January 7, 2019. He was nominated by President Donald Trump in 2018 and was confirmed by the United States Senate in a unanimous vote on January 2, 2019.  On January 18, 2021, Dillingham announced his retirement effective January 20, 2021; his appointment was set to last until the end of 2021. His departure from the office was marked by accusations that he supported a partisan effort to try to use potentially inaccurate data on undocumented immigrants to exclude them from congressional apportionment.

References

External links

People from Orangeburg, South Carolina
1952 births
Living people
Winthrop University alumni
University of South Carolina alumni
University of South Carolina School of Law alumni
George Washington University School of Business alumni
Georgetown University Law Center alumni
University of South Carolina faculty
George Mason University faculty
Peace Corps people
United States Department of Justice officials
Directors of the United States Census Bureau
Trump administration personnel